Tergnier station (French: Gare de Tergnier) is a railway station serving the town Tergnier, Aisne department, northern France. It is situated at kilometric point 130.878 on the Creil–Jeumont railway.

Services

The station is served by regional trains to Compiègne, Amiens, Laon, Saint-Quentin and Paris.

References

Railway stations in Aisne